Dentimargo reductus is a species of sea snail, a marine gastropod mollusk in the family Marginellidae, the margin snails.

Description

Distribution
This species occurs in the Caribbean Sea and the Gulf of Mexico.

References

 Cossignani T. (2006). Marginellidae & Cystiscidae of the World. L'Informatore Piceno. 408pp.
 Espinosa J., Ortea J. & Moro L. (2012) Designación del neotipo de Dentimargo reductus (Bavay, 1922) (Mollusca: Gastropoda: Marginellidae), con la descripción de nuevas especies del género de Cuba y las Bahamas. Revista de la Academia Canaria de Ciencias 23(3): 49–57. [Journal issue for 2011; published April 2012]

External links
  Rosenberg, G., F. Moretzsohn, and E. F. García. 2009. Gastropoda (Mollusca) of the Gulf of Mexico, Pp. 579–699 in Felder, D.L. and D.K. Camp (eds.), Gulf of Mexico–Origins, Waters, and Biota. Biodiversity. Texas A&M Press, College Station, Texas

Marginellidae
Gastropods described in 1922